Honora montinatatella is a species of snout moth in the genus Honora. It was described by George Duryea Hulst in 1887. It is found in western North America, including Arizona, California and Washington.

The wingspan is about 23 mm.

References

Moths described in 1887
Phycitinae